Woodlawn may refer to:
Woodlawn, Campbell County, Virginia
Woodlawn, Carroll County, Virginia
Woodlawn, Colonial Heights, Virginia
Woodlawn, Fairfax County, Virginia
Woodlawn (Alexandria, Virginia) an historic house in Fairfax County
Woodlawn Quaker Meetinghouse in Fort Belvoir, Fairfax County
 Woodlawn (Oilville, Virginia), an historic house in Goochland County, Virginia
Woodlawn, Hanover County, Virginia
Woodlawn, Pittsylvania County, Virginia
Woodlawn (Vernon Hill, Virginia), a home in Pittsylvania County

Woodlawn Manor, Virginia in Fairfax County